Rubén Héctor Sosa (14 November 1936 – 13 September 2008) was an Argentine football forward who played for Argentina in the 1962 FIFA World Cup. He was nicknamed Marqués (Marquis). He also played in Argentina for Racing Club, Platense and Flandria, in Uruguay for Cerro and Nacional and in the United States for the Boston Beacons.

References

External links

Rubén Héctor Sosa (soccerstats)

1936 births
2008 deaths
Argentine footballers
Argentina international footballers
Association football forwards
Racing Club de Avellaneda footballers
1962 FIFA World Cup players
Club Atlético Platense footballers
C.A. Cerro players
Club Nacional de Football players
Boston Beacons players
Argentine expatriate footballers
Expatriate footballers in Uruguay
Expatriate soccer players in the United States
North American Soccer League (1968–1984) players
Copa América-winning players
Argentine expatriate sportspeople in Uruguay
Argentine expatriate sportspeople in the United States